The 2014–15 Quinnipiac Bobcats men's basketball team represented Quinnipiac University during the 2014–15 NCAA Division I men's basketball season. The Bobcats, led by eighth year head coach Tom Moore, played their home games at the TD Bank Sports Center and were members of the Metro Atlantic Athletic Conference. They finished the season 15–15, 9–11 in MAAC play to finish in sixth place. They lost in the first round of the MAAC tournament to Marist.

Roster

Schedule

|-
!colspan=9 style="background:#003664; color:#C2980B;"| Regular season

|-
!colspan=9 style="background:#003664; color:#C2980B;"| MAAC tournament

References

Quinnipiac Bobcats men's basketball seasons
Quinnipiac
Quinnipiac Bobcats men's basketball
Quinnipiac Bobcats men's basketball